The Jackson Police Department provides law enforcement services to approximately 185,000 citizens encompassing  of Jackson, Mississippi, United States. JPD is composed of approximately 430 sworn officers who are supported by over 250 civilian personnel.

Brief history

The Jackson Police Department was established in 1822. 

An ordinance dated January 1864 set a policeman's wages at $40.00 per month, with the exception of the city marshal, who received half the fee paid by each person put in jail. Off-duty police officers took the ferry below LeFleur's Bluff across the Pearl River into what is now Rankin County to bring back firewood to sell. 

Eventually, pay was raised to $60.00 per month for men working twelve-hour shifts, seven days a week. There were no holidays, vacation days or days off.

1873 marked the appearance of the first uniformed police officers with caps, badges, and batons. 1878 marked the turning point of specialized police services, when the first police detective was appointed. In 1901, "patrol" became a rank, and men were hired for that position. In 1909, "desk sergeants" were appointed, along with mounted police, and detectives wore plain clothes for the first time. In 1917, greatly expanded specialized bureaus and divisions were formed.  Early police communications were strictly one-way. The transmitter and radio operator were located at City Hall with the call letters WAMK. Officers had to depend on "call boxes" located on light poles in the downtown area to reply. It was 1952 when the department occupied a modern headquarters building at 327 East Pascagoula Street. This allowed the Jackson Police Department to operate both a municipal court and jail from one location. 

The Police Training Academy was constructed in 1965 to consolidate instruction and training of personnel. The pistol range, included as a part of the training academy, was built on East McDowell Road.

In 1972, the first female officer was sworn in. In 1978, the city's growth prompted the police department to move to the precinct system. 

There are now four precincts. In 1979, officers were provided with individual walkie-talkies which gave them an emergency distress button. In 1983, the size of the department grew to over 400 sworn police officers. In 2005, Shirlene Anderson was sworn in as the first female Chief of police.

Jackson State killings 

On May 15, 1970, during a period of student unrest over the Vietnam War and other issues, officers with the Jackson Police and the Mississippi Highway Safety Patrol opened fire with more than 150 rounds of "shotgun, carbine, rifle, and submachine gun fire", including armor-piercing bullets, on a women's dormitory at Jackson State College, killing Phillip Gibbs, a prelaw major, and James Green, a local high school student, and injuring 12 others. A federal commission found the response "unreasonable, unjustified" and "clearly unwarranted", and that the Jackson officers then engaged in a "pattern of deceit", with each officer falsely claiming he had not fired a shot, until shells collected by the highway patrol were surrendered under federal grand jury order, and FBI laboratory tests confirmed that they had been fired by city police shotguns.

Real Time Command Center
Vincent Grizzell, a 30 year veteran of the Jackson Police Department envisioned a virtual policing center. The center would assist patrol officers in their day-to-day operations by allowing staff to see incidents prior to the patrol officer arriving to a scene. The concept came with heavy criticism from city leaders and the ACLU. The multimillion-dollar facility opened in late 2020, and continued to struggle with those among police ranks and skeptical citizens. In late 2021, Police Chief James Davis began recruiting Eric B. Fox to return to the department. In 2022, Fox was assigned to the Real Time Command Center to assist Grizzell in the completion of the build out.

Notable People

 Frank Melton, former Mayor of Jackson MS known for his heavy hand and participation in the Police Department. 
 Eric B. Fox, 1999-2017, in 2015 he received an 11th citation award, Eric holds more citations than any other Police Officer in Mississippi History.

Rank structure

Fallen officers

Major Events

 Killing of George Robinson
 Jackson State killings
 List of law enforcement agencies in Mississippi

References

External links
 Jackson Police website

Organizations based in Jackson, Mississippi
Municipal police departments of Mississippi
1822 establishments in Mississippi
Government of Jackson, Mississippi